Macrozamia conferta is a species of plant in the family Zamiaceae. It is endemic to Queensland, Australia.

This species grows in eucalypt woodland habitat. There are six or seven known subpopulations. The species may be threatened by poaching.

References

conferta
Endangered flora of Australia
Endangered biota of Queensland
Vulnerable flora of Australia
Flora of Queensland
Nature Conservation Act vulnerable biota
Plants described in 1994
Taxonomy articles created by Polbot
Taxa named by Paul Irwin Forster
Taxa named by David L. Jones (botanist)